Rupnik is a surname. People with the surname include:

Franjo Rupnik (1921–2000), Croatian footballer
Jure Rupnik (born 1993), Slovenian bicycle racer
Leon Rupnik (1880–1946), Slovenian general and war criminal
Lidija Rupnik (1915–2003), Slovenian gymnast
Luka Rupnik (born 1993), Slovenian basketball player
Marko Ivan Rupnik (born 1954), Slovenian priest, author, mosaicist
Vasja Rupnik (born 1977), Slovenian biathlete
Vuk Rupnik (1912–1975), Slovene military officer WWII

Slovene-language surnames